Mieruniszki  is a village in the administrative district of Gmina Filipów, within Suwałki County, Podlaskie Voivodeship, in north-eastern Poland.

The village has a population of 170.

Notable residents
 Hans-Dieter Tippenhauer (1943–2021), German football manager

References

Mieruniszki